Qeshlaq-e Ayan Ali may refer to:
Qeshlaq-e Ayan Ali Barat
Qeshlaq-e Ayan Ali Samad